The Flame Thrower Tank M67 (also known as M67 "Zippo", nicknamed after a popular brand of cigarette lighter) is an American flame tank that was briefly used by the U.S. Army, and later by the U.S. Marine Corps during the Vietnam War. It was the last flamethrower tank used in American military service.

Background and development 
Drawing on the experiences of crews of M4 Sherman tanks that were converted into flamethrower tanks and used during World War II, the U.S. Army Chemical Corps began work on a successor tank that was designed for the battlefields of the Cold War. Work on the design took place between 1952 and 1954, utilizing a modified M48 tank chassis, at the initiative of the US Marine Corps. Production commenced in 1955 and ran for either a single year or four, depending on some estimates. A total of 109 M67 tanks were produced for the Marine Corps and US Army.

Service history 

The M67 was primarily used for mop-up style operations, and like all flamethrower tanks, it was intended to be used primarily against infantry. The "Zippo" featured no main cannon; the M48's 90mm gun was replaced with the tank's flamethrower. While firing in quick bursts, the M67's firing was described as appearing as "rods of flames". The natural fear of being burned to death gave an added shock  factor to the M67.

The M67 remained in service until 1974, when it was retired from use without a replacement. The modern-day United States military has no flamethrower tanks in service.

Variants 
 T67: Prototype flamethrower tank used for testing purposes.
 M67: First version used in service.
 M67A1: M48A2 Patton converted to use the Flamethrower Tank Turret M1.
 M67A2: M48A3 Patton converted to use the Flamethrower Tank Turret M1.

Former operators 
 : Used by U.S. Army, and by U.S. Marine Corps from 1955 to 1974.

Bibliography

References

External links 

 M67 Zippo- Tanks Encyclopedia
 Flame Thrower Tank M67

Cold War tanks of the United States
Military equipment of the Vietnam War
Medium tanks of the Cold War
Medium tanks of the United States
Flame tanks
Chemical weapon delivery systems
Military vehicles introduced in the 1950s